The initials MHT may refer to:

 Male hose thread, usually found on garden hoses - see Garden hose#Standards and connectors
 Manchester–Boston Regional Airport, New Hampshire, US, IATA code
 Manufacturers Hanover Trust, a (former) bank now part of JPMorgan Chase
 .mht, the file extension for an MHTML file
 Marshall Islands time zone
 Masculinizing hormone therapy, a medical treatment
 Mechanical heat treatment, one of waste treatment technology
 Menopausal hormone therapy, a medical treatment
 Multiple hypothesis tracker in radar